Ploy is an abstract strategy board game for two or four players, played on a 9x9 board with a set of 15 pieces (2-handed) or 9 pieces (4-handed and partnership games) per player.  Pieces have various horizontal, vertical or diagonal moves somewhat like chess pieces, except directions of movement are limited; pieces change directions of movement by "rotating".  Object of the game is to capture the opponent's Commander (analogous to the king in chess), or all of his other pieces.

It was invented by Frank Thibault and commercially released by 3M Company in 1970, as part of the 3M bookshelf game series. The game is said to have a "chess-like feel".  The game set includes a board and fifty pieces of various colors and shapes. The game is marketed as a "space-age strategy game". It is also considered to be one of the “better” chess variations.  3M no longer produces games, but Ploy has been adapted for play on Vassal, Zillions of Games or via a ploy program.

Game mechanics
The following game mechanics are identical for all variations of play.

Board
The game board is square with nine spaces on a side. Vertical, horizontal, and diagonal lines connect the spaces. Players move their pieces along the lines.

Pieces
Each piece has a set number of “indicators,” which determine which direction the piece can travel in at any given time. A piece can only travel in directions its indicators are pointing. Each player starts off with an equal number of Shields, Probes, and Lances, as well as one Commander each.

The Shields have one directional indicator and can only move one space at a time. However, the Shields are the only pieces that can perform a direction move after a motion move.

The Probes have two directional indicators and can move one or two spaces at a time.

The Lances have three directional indicators and can move one, two, or three spaces at a time.

The Commander has four directional indicators, but can only move one space at a time. If a player or team captures their opponent's Commander(s), the game ends. One of two alternate ways to end the game is to capture all of the opponent's pieces except for the Commander(s).

Moves

Direction Moves
A direction move is when a player changes the direction that any one piece faces on the board. Since each piece may only move a certain number of directions on any given turn, some strategy lies in determining when to move and when to change directions. A player may not change the direction of more than one piece on a turn. They may not use a direction move on the same turn as a motion move (the only exception being with the Shield piece).

Motion Moves
A motion move is when a player moves one of their pieces vertically, horizontally, or diagonally along the lines of the board and into an unoccupied space. However, a piece's move is limited by the direction(s) its indicator(s) are pointed, as well as the type of piece. A player may not move more than one piece on a turn, and a player may only move in the direction of one of the piece's indicators. If a space is occupied by a piece of another color, the player may capture it.

Captures
If it is within a player's ability to do so, they may move one of their pieces to capture an opponent's piece. This is achieved by moving a piece onto a space occupied by an opponent's piece. Only one piece may be captured per turn.

This game uses displacement capture (like Chess). When a capture is made, the captured piece is removed from the board and the vacated square is occupied by the captor.

Two Player Rules

The rules of play for two players are as follows:

Objectives

The objective is to capture either the opponent's Commander or all of his or her pieces except for the Commander.

Setup

The pieces are arranged according to the picture at right. Only the coral and green colored sets are used for the two-player game, as the yellow and blue sets have a different number of pieces to accommodate for the lower number of pieces used in the four-player game.

Play

The green player goes first. On a player's turn, they may make either a motion move or a directional move. Play alternates until the game is over.

Four Player Game
The rules for the four-player variation are very similar to the two-player rules.

Objective

The objective is to be the last player standing after the others have been eliminated.

Setup

The pieces are arranged according to the picture at right. All four sets of pieces are used, but not every piece from the coral and green sets are used.

Play

On a player's turn, they may make either a motion move or a directional move. If a player's Commander is captured, their remaining pieces fall under the command of the capturing player. If all of a player's pieces except for the Commander have been captured, the Commander is removed from play and the player is out of the game. Play continues clockwise until one player remains.

Partnership Game

The Partnership game allows a group of four to play on two teams.

Objectives

The objective is to either capture all of the opposing team's pieces except for the Commander or both of the opposing team's Commanders. A team may also capture the Commander from one player and all of his partner's pieces except for the Commander.

Setup

The pieces are arranged according to the picture at right. All four sets of pieces are used, but not every pieces from the coral and green sets is used.

Play

Partners move their pieces on separate turns, and the order of play alternates between teams. A player may play as long as he has pieces in play and none of the conditions for winning have been met. Once a player loses all of his pieces, he or she is out of the game. Their partner continues to play until one team wins.

Ways to play

Ploy can be played online via the Vassal Engine.  Also you can play against three different computer AI's, Jean-Louis Cazaux's for Zillions of Games, M. Winther's for Zillions, or Thomas Tensi's Ploy program.

Further reading

David Pritchard's book Popular Indoor Games (1977, Coles) has a description of the rules and strategy of Ploy along with other games.

Reviews
Games and Puzzles
Games & Puzzles #22

See also
 Feudal, another somewhat chess-like game in the 3M bookshelf series
 Xiangqi, "Chinese chess", a game that's similar in outward appearance

References

External links
  at The Game Pile
  at boardgamegeek.com

Board games introduced in 1970
Abstract strategy games
3M bookshelf game series